Chauncey Pratt Williams (December 6, 1860 – December 25, 1936) was an American historian, banker, and soldier. 

Williams graduated from Sheffield Scientific School at Yale University, where he was a member of the varsity crew, and the Albany Law School. He was president of the Albany Exchange Bank and, from 1909 to 1917, served as adjutant-general of the New York National Guard. Williams wrote extensively on the history of the American West, including biographies of the trappers  Antoine Robidoux and Bill Williams; United States Senator Philip Schuyler; and frontiersmen John Hoback and John Coulter. His works on this subject are held at Yale's Beinecke Rare Book and Manuscript Library. 

In 1886 he married Emma McClure.

References

External links 
Chauncey Pratt Williams Writings on the American West. Yale Collection of Western Americana, Beinecke Rare Book and Manuscript Library.

Albany Law School alumni
Adjutants General of New York (state)
1860 births
1936 deaths